Firuzabad (also Romanized as Fīrūzābād) is a village in Panjak-e Rastaq Rural District, Kojur District, Nowshahr County, Mazandaran Province, Iran. As of its 2006 census, its population was at 424 across 119 families.

References 

Populated places in Nowshahr County